Positive Montenegro was a centrist, social-liberal political party in Montenegro. The party was founded in May 2012 by former environmental activist Darko Pajović.

History
In the 2012 parliamentary elections, PCG became an opposition parliamentary party, winning 8.4% of popular vote, and 7 seats in Parliament. However, during its first parliamentary mandate the Party went through significant turbulence. During 2013 due to disagreement with the leadership of the party, one MP has stopped being a member of the party. In 2014, the Party encountered a big split, when three (of six remaining) party MPs left the party due to disagreements with party leader Pajović, after which Mladen Bojanić became an independent MP, and other two Dritan Abazović and Miloš Konatar was involved in the foundation of the new centre-left political party United Reform Action (URA).

In 2016 a fourth MP left the party and resigned as an MP due to disagreement with the party's decision to support Prime Minister Đukanović and his cabinet. On 27 January 2016, despite formerly being an opposition party, PCG provided the ruling Democratic Party of Socialists (DPS) with 3 votes necessary to win the government confidence vote, after the junior partner Social Democratic Party (SDP) left the government due to allegations of electoral fraud and political corruption, therefore forming a new ruling majority. Following this vote, national media and other opposition parties accused the party for deceiving and betraying its voters in order to save Prime Minister Đukanović. In turn, in June 2016 Pajović was appointed as the President of the Parliament, position formerly held by Ranko Krivokapić (SDP), and held the position until October 2016.

After PCG lost its parliamentary status at the October 2016 parliamentary election in which it won 1.32% of the votes, Pajović announced his resignation as the party leader, leaving Vice President Azra Jasavić to serve as acting President until the next party congress. The scheduled congress did not take place, former party president Pajović leave the PCG membership, prior 2018 when he took office as Montenegrin ambassador to China, as did acting president Jasavić shortly after, leaving the status of the party leadership unclear, and the party in the de facto process of dissolution. Party eventually dissolved prior to 2020.

Legislative elections

Positions held
Major positions held by the Positive Montenegro members:

References

Political parties established in 2012
2012 establishments in Montenegro
Social liberal parties
Pro-European political parties in Montenegro
2019 disestablishments in Montenegro